Unoprostone (INN) is a prostaglandin analogue. Its isopropyl ester, unoprostone isopropyl, was marketed under the trade name Rescula for the management of open-angle glaucoma and ocular hypertension.

It was approved by the Food and Drug Administration in 2000.

In 2009, Sucampo Pharmaceuticals acquired the rights to the drug in the U.S. and Canada.

In 2015, the drug was discontinued in the U.S.

References

Prostaglandins
Ophthalmology drugs